"Don't Let Go" is a song by Scottish singer-songwriter David Sneddon, released as a single on 21 April 2003. Written by Sneddon and Scott MacAlister, the song reached  3 on the UK Singles Chart and No. 36 in Ireland. It was the second single and follow up to Sneddon's debut number-one hit, "Stop Living the Lie".

The song was included on Sneddon's debut album, Seven Years – Ten Weeks. The B-sides to this song – "She Needs to Know", "The Longest Time" and "Smile Again" – did not appear on the album.

Track listings
UK CD1
 "Don't Let Go"
 "She Needs to Know"
 "The Longest Time"
 "Don't Let Go" (CD-ROM video)

UK CD2
 "Don't Let Go"
 "Smile Again"
 "Stop Living the Lie" (CD-ROM video)

UK cassette single
 "Don't Let Go"
 "Smile Again"

Charts

Weekly charts

Year-end charts

References

2003 singles
2003 songs
David Sneddon songs
Mercury Records singles
Number-one singles in Scotland
Song recordings produced by Hugh Padgham
Songs written by David Sneddon
Songs written by Scott MacAlister